is a 2003 Japanese horror comedy crime film directed by Takashi Miike and written by Sakichi Sato. The film blends yakuza stories with ghost stories, bizarre vignettes, urban legends, and Japanese folk legends.

Plot
Ozaki (Aikawa), a mentally unstable yakuza, kills a chihuahua outside a restaurant after becoming convinced that it is actually an attack dog trained to kill gangsters. Seeing Ozaki as a security risk, the head of the Azamawari yakuza clan (Ishibashi) orders fellow underling Minami (Sone), who is Ozaki’s brother, to kill him and dispose of his body in a company depot.

Minami, reluctant to murder Ozaki, unwittingly kills him when he pushes him to the ground in an attempt to stop him from killing an innocent woman who he mistook for an assassin. After finding the road he was driving along mysteriously replaced with a large lake, he enters a coffee shop to find a phone. Minami is given a complimentary meal that makes him violently throw up in the bathroom and returns to discover that Ozaki's body is missing. When he asks the people in the town, he finds most of them apprehensive and uncooperative. He then sets out to explore the nearly-deserted, run-down suburb of Nagoya in a desperate attempt to recover the body, only to find himself caught in a series of increasingly surreal situations. He meets several strange characters including an elderly innkeeper obsessed with her breast milk, her strange brother who can supposedly channel spirits, a waiter who died three years ago in a car accident and gozu or a man with a cow's head, who appears to him in a dream. Minami tracks Ozaki to a junk yard, where he is told that he was murdered and turned into a skin suit. He returns to his car to find a girl (Yoshino) who claims to be Ozaki. After sharing intimate details of their life, as well as one of his dreams, he believes her.

Minami and the female Ozaki spend the night at a hotel. During the night, Minami hears what sounds like a voice emanating from the female Ozaki’s vagina while she sleeps. She wakes up and asks Minami if he wants to have sex with her; he rejects her advances.

The next day, Minami drives the female Ozaki back to his gang’s office, with the intent of explaining the situation to his boss. However, once they arrive, the female Ozaki claims that she is actually the daughter of another yakuza family’s deceased boss, and that she wishes to start working for Minami’s boss.

The boss takes the female Ozaki to his office to have sex with her, leaving Minami outside. The boss inserts the handle of a ladle into his anus, as this is apparently the only way he can achieve an erection. Minami sneaks back into the office, and confronts his boss; in the ensuing physical altercation, the boss falls backwards, impaling himself on the ladle achieving orgasm. Minami electrocutes the unconscious boss with exposed wires from a light fitting, then leaves with the female Ozaki.

Minami and the female Ozaki return to Minami’s home. Minami gives in to his temptations, and at the behest of the female Ozaki, they begin to have sex. However, as soon as he penetrates her, something latches onto his penis from within the female Ozaki; as Minami recoils in horror, a human hand emerges from the female Ozaki’s vagina. The original male Ozaki then extricates himself from the female Ozaki as Minami cowers in the corner of the room.

In the final scene of the movie, the two male brothers, along with the female Ozaki, are seen walking down the street together, arms linked.

Cast

 Hideki Sone as Minami
 Show Aikawa as Ozaki
 Kimika Yoshino as Female Ozaki
 Shōhei Hino as Nose
 Keiko Tomita as Innkeeper
 Harumi Sone as Innkeeper's Brother
 Renji Ishibashi as Boss

Release
Shot on a low budget, the movie was originally planned for direct-to-video release on DVD. However, its positive reception at the Cannes Film Festival in May 2003 secured its theatrical release overseas.

Critical reception
On the review aggregator website Rotten Tomatoes, the film has an approval rating of 72%, based on 57 reviews. Metacritic, which uses a weighted average, assigned the film has a score of 58 out of 100 based on 19 critics, indicating "Mixed or average reviews". In a review for The Washington Post, Michael O'Sullivan wrote that "Gozu makes little sense on paper. As a film, however, it somehow feels richly, hilariously real, even – at its most bizarre – familiar." Ty Burr of The Boston Globe called it "creatively unhinged" and referred to it as "not your average midnight movie but something more hermetic." Jay Boyar of the Orlando Sentinel also reviewed the film positively, writing that "there is something compelling about the way this film sneakily taps into our collective psychosexual fantasies."

A. O. Scott of The New York Times wrote that "For Mr. Miike's fans, it will be an indispensable compendium of outtakes and sketches. For others, it will be a mystifying and provocative introduction to his unnerving, wanton and prodigious imagination." Stephen Hunter of The Washington Post wrote that the film "is not in line with [Miike's] best work". G. Allen Johnson of SFGate wrote that the film "is for Miike freaks only (and you know who you are). Everyone else: Stay far, far away." Jeff Shannon of The Seattle Times called the film "an undisciplined mess", writing that it "trades Lynch's nightmare logic for exasperating incoherence".

References

External links
 
 
 
 
 
  Gozu at the Japanese Movie Database

2003 films
2003 horror films
Japanese horror films
2000s comedy horror films
Yakuza films
Films directed by Takashi Miike
2003 comedy films
2000s Japanese films